Edith Blackwell Holden (26 September 1871 – 15 March 1920) was a British artist and art teacher. She was born in Kings Norton, Birmingham. She became famous following the posthumous publication of her Nature Notes for 1906, in facsimile form, as the book The Country Diary of an Edwardian Lady in 1977, which was an enormous publishing success. These, and her life story, were later the subject of a television dramatization.

Overview 
From 1906 to 1909, she taught at a school in Solihull.

Her paintings were exhibited by the Royal Birmingham Society of Artists (1890–1907), and by the Royal Academy of Arts in 1907 and 1917.

In 1911, she  married Alfred Ernest Smith, born 1879, a sculptor.

Collecting flowers from a riverbank at Kew Gardens, she drowned in the Thames in 1920.

Life

Edith Blackwell Holden (1871–1920) was a British artist and part-time art teacher, known in her time as an illustrator of children's books. Much influenced by the Arts and Crafts movement, she specialised in painting animals and plants. Holden was made famous by the posthumous publication, in 1977, of her Nature Notes for 1906 under the title The Country Diary of an Edwardian Lady.  She was living in Gowan Bank, Kineton Green Road, Olton, Solihull in 1905–06 when she recorded the notes.  The collection of seasonal observations, poetry, and pictures of birds, plants, and insects—which was never even considered for publication when it was composed—had the nostalgic charm of a vanished world seven decades later.  It became a world-wide best seller.

Early life 
Edith's mother was Emma Wearing, a Spiritualist and Unitarian, and former governess who wrote two religious books, Ursula's Childhood and Beatrice of St Mawse, published by the Society for Promoting Christian Knowledge. Her father, also a Unitarian and Spiritualist, was Arthur Holden—owner of Arthur Holden & Son's Paint Factory in Bradford Street, Birmingham, noted Town Councillor and charity worker. Edith's middle name honoured the pioneer woman physician, Elizabeth Blackwell, also a Unitarian and the Holdens' cousin.  The Holden family attended the Birmingham Labour Church.

Before the death of Edith's mother Emma in 1904, the Holden family had become Spiritualists. The Holdens held regular Spiritualist seances at home in Olton, with the intention of communicating with the spirit of their deceased wife and mother. Edith and her four sisters were instrumental in assisting their father with these communications, which culminated in 1913, when Edith's father published them in his own diary, entitled Messages from the Unseen, only weeks before his own death.

During the 1906–09 school years, Edith Holden taught at the Solihull School for Girls. She fashioned her Nature Notes for 1906 as a model for her students' work. Then, like her younger sisters, Holden became an illustrator. She illustrated four volumes, 1907–10, of The Animal's Friend, a magazine of the National Council for Animals' Welfare, and a number of children's books, including The Three Goats Gruff. Her paintings were often exhibited from 1890–1907 by the Royal Birmingham Society of Artists, and by the Royal Academy of Arts in 1907 and 1917.

Marriage 
In 1911 Edith Holden, at the age of thirty-nine, married Ernest Smith, a sculptor, seven years her junior.  Smith became principal assistant to Countess Feodora Gleichen. At the Countess's studio in St James Palace the Smiths associated with leading artists such as Sir George Frampton, sculptor of the statue of Peter Pan in Kensington Gardens, and royal visitors such as King Faisal of Arabia. Edith continued her career as an illustrator; the couple had no children.

Death 
On Tuesday, 16 March 1920, she was found drowned in a backwater of the River Thames, near Kew Gardens Walk.  On the prior Monday morning Edith had complained to Ernest of a headache, but this was not uncommon and the matter had not been dwelt on. The main subject at breakfast had been the impending visit of some friends for Easter, to which Edith was looking forward. Ernest left for the studio at St James's Palace and Edith said that she would probably go down to the river later to see the University crews practicing.

When Ernest returned home that evening, his wife was out, but the table had been laid for the evening meal; Ernest assumed that she was with friends. It was not until the next morning that he learned that her body had been found at six o'clock on the Tuesday morning. The inquest established that she had tried to reach a branch of chestnut buds. The bough was out of reach, and with the aid of her umbrella, Edith had tried to break it off, fallen forward into the river and drowned.

Bibliography
The Country Diary of an Edwardian Lady (1977)
The Nature Notes of an Edwardian Lady (1989)

Works she illustrated
The Animal's Friend (four volumes, 1907–1910, the magazine of the National Council for Animals' Welfare)
Daily Bread (1910) by Margaret Gatty
Woodland Whisperings (1911) by Margaret Rankin
a series of undated children's books published by Henry Frowde/Hodder & Stoughton
Animals Around Us
Birds
Beasts and Fishes
The Three Goats Gruff
Mrs Strang's Annual for Children.
The Hedgehog Feast (text by her great-niece Rowena Stot; 1978)

A number of her illustrations have since been used on tie-in products, from books such as Country Diary Recipes to cookware, stationery and ornaments.

Biographies 
 The Edwardian Lady: The Story of Edith Holden, Ina Taylor (1980)
 The Edwardian Afterlife Diary of Emma Holden, K Jackson-Barnes (2013) 
(IT) Sara Staffolani, Una Lady nella campagna inglese. Vita e opere di Edith Holden, flower-ed 2018. ISBN cartaceo 978-88-85628-43-4 ISBN ebook 978-88-85628-42-

References

External links
Dictionary of Unitarian and Universalist Biography entry
Biography

1871 births
1920 deaths
Artists from Birmingham, West Midlands
English illustrators
People from Olton
Sibling artists